N Centauri is a binary star in the southern constellation of Centaurus. The brighter star is dimly visible to the naked eye with an apparent visual magnitude of 5.26, and it is approximately 304 light years away based on parallax.  It has an absolute magnitude of +0.76 and is drifting further away from the Sun with a radial velocity of +27 km/s. It is a candidate member of the Sco OB2 moving group.

The double nature of this system was discovered by German astronomer Carl Rümker in 1835. As of 2016, the companion lay at an angular separation of  along a position angle of 289° from the primary. The more luminous member is a B-type main-sequence star with a stellar classification of B9V. Its fainter companion is an F-type main-sequence star with a class of F0Vn, where the 'n' suffix indicates that the metal absorption lines in its spectrum are unusual broad ("nebulous") and indicative of rapid rotation. Based upon discrepancies in the proper motion measurements, there are hints of a third member of this system.

References 

B-type main-sequence stars
F-type main-sequence stars
Double stars
Centauri, N
Durchmusterung objects
Centaurus (constellation)
120642
067703
5207